was a government position in Japan in the late Nara and Heian periods. The position was consolidated in the Taihō Code of 702. The Asuka Kiyomihara Code of 689 marks the initial appearance of the udaijin in the context of a central administrative body called the Daijō-kan (Council of State). This early Daijō-kan was composed of the three ministers—the daijō-daijin (Chancellor), the sadaijin (Minister of the Left) and the udaijin.

The udaijin was the Junior Minister of State, overseeing all branches of the Daijō-kan. He would be the deputy of the sadaijin.

The post of udaijin, along with the rest of the Daijō-kan structure, gradually lost power over the 10th and 11th centuries, as the Fujiwara came to dominate politics more and more. The system was essentially powerless by the end of the 12th century, when the Minamoto, a warrior clan and branch of the imperial family, seized control of the country from the court aristocracy (kuge). However, it is not entirely clear whether the Daijō-kan system was formally dismantled prior to the Meiji era.

See also
 Daijō-kan
 Kugyō
 Sesshō and Kampaku
 List of Daijō-daijin
 Kōkyū
 Kuge
 Imperial Household Agency

Notes

References

  Asai, T. (1985). Nyokan Tūkai. Tokyo: Kōdansha.
 Dickenson, Walter G. (1869). Japan: Being a Sketch of the History, Government and Officers of the Empire. London: W. Blackwood and Sons. 
 Hall, John Whitney, Delmer M. Brown and Kozo Yamamura. (1993).  The Cambridge History of Japan. Cambridge: Cambridge University Press. 
 Ozaki, Yukio. (2001). The Autobiography of Ozaki Yukio: The Struggle for Constitutional Government in Japan. [Translated by Fujiko Hara]. Princeton: Princeton University Press.  (cloth)
  Ozaki, Yukio. (1955). Ozak Gakudō Zenshū. Tokyo: Kōronsha.
 Sansom, George (1958). A History of Japan to 1334. Stanford: Stanford University Press.
 Screech, Timon. (2006). Secret Memoirs of the Shoguns:  Isaac Titsingh and Japan, 1779–1822. London: Routledge Curzon.  
  Titsingh, Isaac. (1834). [Siyun-sai Rin-siyo/Hayashi Gahō, 1652], Nipon o daï itsi ran; ou,  Annales des empereurs du Japon.  Paris: Oriental Translation Fund of Great Britain and Ireland.
 Varley, H. Paul, ed. (1980). [ Kitabatake Chikafusa, 1359], Jinnō Shōtōki ("A Chronicle of Gods and Sovereigns: Jinnō Shōtōki of Kitabatake Chikafusa" translated by H. Paul Varley). New York: Columbia University Press.  

Government of feudal Japan
Japanese historical terms
Meiji Restoration